John Goodnow (June 29, 1858 – December 7, 1907) was a businessman and American diplomat who served for eight years as United States Consul General in Shanghai.

Early life
Goodnow was born June 29, 1858, in Greensburg, Indiana, the son of Lt Col. James Goodnow of the 12th Indiana Volunteers.  He attended the University of Minnesota and resided in Minneapolis until 1897.

Diplomatic career
In 1897, Goodnow was nominated for the position of United States Consul-General in Shanghai, China by Republican President William McKinley. He had been president of the Republican State League. His nomination had been opposed by Republicans in his home state.  However, the Senate approved the nomination. 
  
Goodnow resigned from the foreign service in 1905 following an investigation into misconduct in office.  The alleged misconduct included permitting the transfer of Chinese ships to the US flag under a fraudulent bill of sale; irregularity of accounts; improper threat of legal proceedings and breaking and entering into premises of a US Citizen.

Death
Goodnow died of apoplexy in Málaga, Spain on December 7, 1897.  He was buried in the English Cemetery, Málaga.

References 

1858 births
1907 deaths
People from Greensburg, Indiana
People from Minneapolis
University of Minnesota alumni
American diplomats
Minnesota politicians convicted of crimes
Consuls general of the United States in Shanghai